The 2018–19 Dijon FCO season was the 20th professional season of the club since its creation in 1998.

Players

Out on loan

Competitions

Ligue 1

League table

Results summary

Results by round

Matches

Relegation play-offs

Coupe de France

Coupe de la Ligue

Statistics

Appearances and goals

|-
! colspan="14" style="background:#dcdcdc; text-align:center"| Goalkeepers

|-
! colspan="14" style="background:#dcdcdc; text-align:center"| Defenders

|-
! colspan="14" style="background:#dcdcdc; text-align:center"| Midfielders

|-
! colspan="14" style="background:#dcdcdc; text-align:center"| Forwards

|-
! colspan="14" style="background:#dcdcdc; text-align:center"| Players transferred out during the season

|-

References

Dijon FCO seasons
Dijon FCO